Konstantynów may refer to the following locations in Poland:
Konstantynów Łódzki, a town near Łódź in central Poland
Konstantynów, a district of Lublin
Konstantynów, Lublin Voivodeship (east Poland)
Konstantynów, Kutno County in Łódź Voivodeship (central Poland)
Konstantynów, Łowicz County in Łódź Voivodeship (central Poland)
Konstantynów, Opoczno County in Łódź Voivodeship (central Poland)
Konstantynów, Pajęczno County in Łódź Voivodeship (central Poland)
Konstantynów, Rawa County in Łódź Voivodeship (central Poland)
Konstantynów, Płock County in Masovian Voivodeship (east-central Poland)
Konstantynów, Sochaczew County in Masovian Voivodeship (east-central Poland)
Konstantynów, Greater Poland Voivodeship (west-central Poland)
Konstantynów, Silesian Voivodeship (south Poland)

See also
Konstantynowo (disambiguation)